{{infobox person  
| image = Tommy Rettig Donald Keeler Lassie circa 1956.JPG  
|caption = Tommy Rettig and Joey D. Vieira (AKA Donald Keeler) on Lassie TV series 1956 
| name = Joey D. Vieira
| birth_name= Joseph Douglas Vieira 
| other_names   =Donald Keeler 
| birth_place =
| birth_date = 
| occupation = Film and television actor
| relatives = Ken Weatherwax (half brother)Ruby Keeler (aunt)
}} 
Joseph Douglas Vieira, known as Joey D. Vieira (born April 8, 1944), is an American film and television actor. He began as a child actor using the professional name Donald Keeler playing chubby, beanie-wearing farm boy, Sylvester "Porky" Brockway in the first several seasons (1954–57) of TV's Lassie (retitled Jeff's Collie in syndicated reruns and on DVD). Vieira borrowed the professional surname from his aunt, Ruby Keeler, star of numerous Warner Bros. musicals in the 1930s.

Other early TV appearances include The Pride of the Family, The Many Loves of Dobie Gillis, Shirley Temple's Storybook, and My Three Sons. Film appearances include The Private War of Major Benson (1955) with Charlton Heston and The Patriot (2000) with Mel Gibson in which he played as Peter Howard. Vieira has also written, produced and directed.

He also had a music career in the 1970s and 1980s. One of his songs was sampled by the Tyler The Creator song "911/Mr.Lonely" on his album Flower Boy.

Family
In addition to being the nephew of Ruby Keeler, he was the half-brother of actor Ken Weatherwax, best known for portraying Pugsley Addams on the 1960s television sitcom The Addams Family.

Partial filmographyThe Private War of Major Benson (1955) - Cadet Cpl. ScawalskiBob & Carol & Ted & Alice (1969) - Dishwasher (uncredited)Evel Knievel (1971) - Lunch Truck DriverWooju heukgisa (1979) - (English version, voice)Monaco Forever (1984) - NarratorFerris Bueller's Day Off (1986) - Pizza ManRed Heat (1988) - Man at Phone BoothLove, Cheat & Steal (1993) - Bullet Head #1 Me and the Gods (1997) - Dionysus Free Enterprise (1998) - Hal PittmanGrizzly Adams and the Legend of Dark Mountain (1999) - Joey ButterworthThe Patriot (2000) - Peter HowardNebraska (2001) - Fat SamFuel (2008) - Floyd MillerDwegons And Leprechauns'' (2014) - Davargan / Yabo Potato / Sweetfang / Clyde (voice)

References

External links
 

1944 births
American male child actors
American male film actors
American male television actors
Living people
Male actors from Los Angeles